Chaundee Dwaine Brown Jr. (born December 4, 1998) is an American professional basketball player for the Austin Spurs of the NBA G League. He played college basketball for the Wake Forest Demon Deacons and the Michigan Wolverines.

High school career
Brown attended Dr. Phillips High School in Dr. Phillips, Florida and transferred to The First Academy in Orlando, Florida for his junior year. As a senior, he averaged 24.7 points and 6.7 rebounds per game. Brown was named Florida Gatorade Player of the Year and 4A Player of the Year. He committed to playing college basketball for Wake Forest over offers from Kansas, Indiana and Florida, among others. A four-star recruit, Brown became the program's highest-ranked commitment since Al-Farouq Aminu and Tony Woods in 2008.

College career
As a freshman, Brown was a regular starter at Wake Forest, averaging 7.6 points and three rebounds per game. In his sophomore season, he averaged 11.9 points and 4.9 rebounds per game. Brown averaged 12.1 points and 6.5 rebounds per game as a junior. He was sidelined for eight games with ankle and calf injuries. For his senior season, Brown transferred to Michigan, choosing the Wolverines over Gonzaga and Illinois. He received a waiver for immediate eligibility from the NCAA. He averaged 8 points and 3.1 rebounds per game while shooting 41.9% from 3-point range. On April 10, 2021, Brown declared for the 2021 NBA draft forgoing an extra year of college eligibility.

Professional career

South Bay Lakers (2021)
After going undrafted in the 2021 NBA draft, Brown signed with the Los Angeles Lakers on August 10, 2021. However, he was waived on October 15. On October 23, Brown signed with the South Bay Lakers as an affiliate player, playing one game.

Los Angeles Lakers (2021)
On November 16, 2021, Brown signed a two-way contract with the Los Angeles Lakers. However, he was waived on December 21, after making two appearances with Los Angeles.

Atlanta Hawks / Return to South Bay (2021–2022)
On December 27, 2021, the Atlanta Hawks signed Brown to a 10-day contract. After his deal expired, he returned to South Bay.

On April 9, 2022, Brown signed a two-way contract with the Hawks. On September 11, he was waived by the Hawks.

Austin Spurs (2022–present)
On September 28, 2022, the Austin Spurs announced that they had acquired the returning right of Brown from South Bay Lakers for a first round pick in the 2023 NBA G League Draft and the returning player rights to Galen Robinson. On October 24, 2022, Brown joined the Austin Spurs training camp roster.

Career statistics

NBA

Regular season

|-
| style="text-align:left;"| 
| style="text-align:left;"| L.A. Lakers
| 2 || 0 || 10.5 || .143 || .000 || – || 1.0 || .0 || .0 || .0 || 1.0
|-
| style="text-align:left;"| 
| style="text-align:left;"| Atlanta
| 3 || 2 || 27.7 || .360 || .400 || .833 || 4.7 || 1.3 || .7 || .0 || 9.7
|- class="sortbottom"
| style="text-align:center;" colspan="2"| Career
| 5 || 2 || 20.8 || .313 || .333 || .833 || 3.2 || .8 || .4 || .0 || 6.2

College

|-
| style="text-align:left;"| 2017–18
| style="text-align:left;"| Wake Forest
| 30 || 29 || 20.9 || .411 || .342 || .806 || 3.0 || 1.1 || .2 || .2 || 7.6
|-
| style="text-align:left;"| 2018–19
| style="text-align:left;"| Wake Forest
| 31 || 29 || 29.0 || .408 || .323 || .840 || 4.9 || 1.2 || .7 || .2 || 11.9
|-
| style="text-align:left;"| 2019–20
| style="text-align:left;"| Wake Forest
| 23 || 15 || 28.2 || .456 || .322 || .831 || 6.5 || 1.4 || .5 || .1 || 12.1
|-
| style="text-align:left;"| 2020–21
| style="text-align:left;"| Michigan
| 28 || 1 || 20.6 || .488 || .419 || .690 || 3.1 || .6 || .1 || .3 || 8.0
|- class="sortbottom"
| style="text-align:center;" colspan="2"| Career
| 112 || 74 || 24.6 || .435 || .352 || .812 || 4.3 || 1.1 || .4 || .2 || 9.8

References

External links
Michigan Wolverines bio
Wake Forest Demon Deacons bio

1998 births
Living people
American men's basketball players
Atlanta Hawks players
Austin Spurs players
Basketball players from Orlando, Florida
Los Angeles Lakers players
Michigan Wolverines men's basketball players
Shooting guards
South Bay Lakers players
Undrafted National Basketball Association players
Wake Forest Demon Deacons men's basketball players